Zaker (also Romanized as Z̄āker; also known as Zakir) is a village in Garmeh-ye Shomali Rural District, Kandovan District, Meyaneh County, East Azerbaijan Province, Iran. At the 2006 census, its population was 39, in 10 families.

References 

Populated places in Meyaneh County